Schloss Heiligenberg is a Renaissance-style castle in Heiligenberg, Linzgau, north of the Bodensee. It is owned by the Fürstenberg family and is sited on a plateau 730 metres above sea level, with views down onto the Bodensee and the Alps.

History 
It was first built in the Middle Ages - in 1250 count Berthold of Heiligenberg built a burgh on the site, which was bought in 1277 by count Hugo of Werdenberg. Under the counts of Werdenberg-Heiligenberg, the castle expanded during the late Middle Ages.

Through countess Anna of Werdenberg's marriage to count Friedrich zu Fürstenberg in 1516, the burgh passed to the house of Fürstenberg in 1535 - it is still owned by that family today. Shortly before his death in 1559, Friedrich decided to remodel the castle in the Renaissance style. The building as it is seen today dates to count Joachim (1538–1598), who from 1560 to 1575 rebuilt the late medieval burgh into a 'schloss', with a Renaissance-style courtyard and an extended ballroom wing to the south.

Plan

Bibliography 
 Ulrich Feldhahn: Schlösserreise Baden-Württemberg – ein Führer zu Burgen und Schlössern in Privatbesitz. Michael Imhof, Petersberg 2005, .
 Carl Borromäus Alois Fickler: Heiligenberg in Schwaben. Mit einer Geschichte seiner alten Grafen und des von ihnen beherrschten Linzgaues. Macklot, Karlsruhe 1853 (Digitalisat)
 Dr. EW Graf zu Lynar: Schloss Heiligenberg, Verlag Schnell+Steiner München+Zürich 1A 1981

References

External links 

 Information on the Gemeinde Heiligenberg website